The ClearSpace-1 (ClearSpace One) mission is an ESA Space Debris Removal mission led by ClearSpace SA (a spin-off of the EPFL in Lausanne) and its industrial team. The mission's objective is to demonstrate the complete value chain of Active Debris Removal by removing a Vega payload adapter (Vespa Upper Part) from orbit. The mission will demonstrate technologies for rendezvous, capture, and deorbit for end of life satellites and builds the path to space junk remediation. Destructive reentry will destroy both the captured satellites and itself.

In 2019, the company won a tender for a European Space Agency Space Safety program contract in the Active Debris Removal/In-Orbit Servicing (ADRIOS) project. It will target the Vega Secondary Payload Adapter from the 2013 Vega flight VV02 for de-orbiting. The mission contract, worth 86 million euros, was signed in November 2020. As of January 2023, ClearSpace-1 is expected to be launched in 2026 on a Vega-C launch vehicle.

The ClearSpace-1 mission was preceded by e.Deorbit, a space debris removal mission under planning by ESA in 2010s. In the end, the e.Deorbit mission was not implemented, the satellite was not built and the whole e.Deorbit mission was cancelled. ClearSpace-1 continues the ESA space debris removal aspirations.

References

External links
 ClearSpace official homepage

Proposed satellites
Technology demonstration satellites
Satellites of Switzerland
2020s in Switzerland
2026 in spaceflight
Space debris